Jalan Kemajuan Subang is an avenue in Subang Jaya, Selangor, Malaysia.

The Subang Jaya hairpin corner, located at SS19, is considered the biggest hairpin corner in Malaysia.

List of junctions

Highways in Malaysia